Bruce Eugene Barnum (born April 13, 1964) is an American football coach who is the current head coach for the Portland State Vikings college football team.

Early life and education
Born in Vancouver, Washington, Barnum graduated from Columbia River High School in Vancouver in 1982. He then attended Eastern Washington University and participated on the scout team of the Eastern Washington Eagles football team for two seasons. Barnum completed his bachelor's degree in education and history at Eastern Washington University in 1987 and M.Ed. at Western Washington University in 1991.

Coaching career
Barnum began his coaching career as a high school assistant coach in Washington state, first at Central Valley High School in Spokane Valley in 1986 then with his alma mater Columbia River High School from 1987 to 1988.

From 1989 to 1990, Barnum was offensive line coach at Division II Western Washington University. Barnum moved up to the Division I level in 1991 as assistant offensive line coach and freshman offensive coordinator at Cornell, where he would remain for two seasons under Jim Hofher. In 1993, Barnum returned to the Division II level as offensive line coach and run game coordinator at American International College.

Barnum then coached at the Division III level, at Coast Guard as offensive line coach and assistant head coach from 1994 to 1997. After his stint at Coast Guard, Barnum returned to the Division I level at Idaho State and started as offensive line coach in 1998 under Tom Walsh. Under new head coach Larry Lewis, Barnum moved to the defensive line in 1999 and was promoted to defensive coordinator the following season. From 2001 to 2006, Barnum was offensive coordinator.

In 2007, Barnum returned to Cornell as offensive coordinator and offensive line coach, positions he held from 2007 to 2009, this time under Jim Knowles. In 2010, Barnum joined Nigel Burton's coaching staff at Portland State as offensive coordinator.

After he was appointed interim head coach after Nigel Burton was fired in November 2014, Barnum was named as the Vikings' permanent replacement as head coach on December 8, 2014.

Barnum led the Vikings to a 24–17 upset over the Washington State Cougars at Martin Stadium in Pullman, WA on September 5, 2015 for his first career victory as head coach. On October 10 Portland State defeated North Texas 66–7, giving Barnum and the Vikings their second victory over an FBS school in 2015. The 59-point win set a new NCAA record for the largest margin of victory by an FCS school over an FBS opponent. Barnum became the inaugural STATS FCS Coach of the Year for leading Portland State to a 9–3 season and first FCS Playoff appearance in 15 years.

Barnum has occasionally been criticized for deriding opposing teams.  For example, in the week leading up to Portland State's 2016 road matchup with Southern Utah, he caused ripples of outrage in the Utah media when he stated, referring to Cedar City, UT (home of SUU), "I didn't want to stay in Whoville. We are going to stay up in the Grinch's Castle [referring to nearby Brian Head, UT]. We are going to go down, play them Saturday, whoop up on them."  In response to the comments, SUU fans showed up to the game en masse, setting a single-game school attendance record.  Many carried signs and banners mocking Barnum's statements, while others dressed up as characters from "How the Grinch Stole Christmas".  SUU won the game, 45–31.

Personal life
Barnum married the former Shawna Quigley in 1994. They have two children,. In July 2017, Barnum was publicly disciplined by Portland State University following the revelation of an inappropriate relationship with a married female staff member. Barnum received "significant economic sanctions" from the University following the investigation.

Head coaching record

References

External links
 Portland State profile

1964 births
Living people
American International Yellow Jackets football coaches
Cornell Big Red football coaches
Coast Guard Bears football coaches
Idaho State Bengals football coaches
Portland State Vikings football coaches
Western Washington Vikings football coaches
High school football coaches in Washington (state)
Eastern Washington University alumni
Western Washington University alumni
Sportspeople from Vancouver, Washington
Coaches of American football from Washington (state)